The Gaalje'el,, Galjecel is one of the largest Somali clans, whose origins trace back to Samaale. The Galje'el clan belong to the Saransor family of clans, alongside the Issa, Masare and Degodia.

Etymology
According to Ali Jimale, the etymology of the name Gaalje'el is from gaal, meaning camel and je'el meaning love: gaalje'el meaning "that which loves the camel". Gaal is the Af May (Reewin dialect) equivalent of Geel in Af Maḥa Tiri (the Maḥa Tiri dialect).

Another etymology, which has recently gained steam, references the Jaalin tribe of Sudan. By combining "Geel", the dromedory camel for which the tribe is known to rear, with the arabic Al Je'el (الجعل), proponents of this etymology point to the bedouin nature of the Gaalje'el and surmise that the tribe could have had its origins in the nearby country, since they share the names of several branches.

Distribution

The Gaalje'el traditionally settled in the region called Qorahsin of Hiraan, Lower Shabelle, Middle Shabelle These regions are called Qorahsin because it is located west of the Shabelle River, 
and also inhabit in Jubaland,the city of Kismayo the largest rural community is Gaaljecel.
. 
The Gaalje'el are often incorrectly associated with the Hawiye clan due to their close political and social alignment. However, the Gaalje'el actually descend from Saransoor, as do the Degoodi, Masarre and the Iise. This means that there is no closer blood relation than beyond those also shared amongst all Somalis.

History
The conflict between the Italians and the Gaaljecel was a part of the broader conflict between Italy and the Somali people during the colonial era. The Gaaljecel, like many other Somali clans, fiercely resisted the Italian occupation of their land and fought against the Italian colonial forces in the early 20th century.

The Gaaljecel warriors were known for their bravery, skill in battle, and use of guerrilla tactics. They used their knowledge of the terrain to their advantage and employed hit-and-run tactics against the Italian forces. They also made use of traditional weapons such as spears and swords, as well as firearms obtained from other sources.

The Italians, on the other hand, had a technological advantage over the Gaaljecel. They had access to modern weapons, such as machine guns and artillery, which they used to devastating effect. However, the Italians found it difficult to maintain control over the areas inhabited by the Gaaljecel due to the resilience and determination of the clan.

The conflict between the Italians and the Gaaljecel lasted for several years and resulted in many casualties on both sides. The Gaaljecel suffered losses, but they were able to inflict significant damage on the Italian forces, which forced the Italians to adopt more aggressive tactics. The Italian forces responded by conducting punitive raids against the Gaaljecel villages, burning down homes and confiscating livestock.

Despite the odds, the Gaaljecel were able to maintain their resistance against the Italians, which became a source of inspiration for other clans in Somalia. The Gaaljecel's successful resistance against the Italian colonial forces has been seen as a symbol of the resilience and courage of the Somali people in the face of adversity.

Lineage
Gaalje'el is descended from Samaale Saransoor has 4 son's, together with their uncle Garre they are division of Larger Gardheere Samaale clans.

In several Italian narrations, the Gaalje'el, along with the rest of the Saransoor, were incorrectly counted as a subclan of Moolkaal Jibide Gugundhabe, leading to the confusion surrounding their relationship with the Hawiye clan. The Gaalje'el and the Hawiye both descend from Samaale, although via different branches, and do not share a closer lineage beyond that common to all Somali.

Clan tree 
Max Planck Institute for Social Anthropology highlights some of the more prominent families which make up the Gaalje'el

Gaalje'el
Barsame
Mugurmal
Qalafow
Hilowle
Hadowe
Mahamed Hassan
Mahamed Adam
Dumal Ja'eer
Yabar Dumal
Hassan Dumal
Ali Dumal
Soranle
Mu'awiya
Arwaq (Doqondid)
Idris
Ilkole
Zubeir
Mujaber
HilinDoor
Dholadhaqan
Ersandhaali
Dirissame
Abturale
Gergelis
Dalab
Mahad Alla
Wasuge
Cali
Somane
Waceys
Cilmi 
Cabdi nuur 
Cisman 
Orodow 
Ahmed
Dorwaq
Abtisame
Jidfafah
Cidif
Diinloot
Baile
Wareene
Shige
Cabdille Shige (Wehliye)
Ciise Shige (Sheekhaal)
 Maxamed Shige
Haji Saleh
Ab Alin
Dumal Weyn
Yibadhale
Reer Ugaas (Eraballe) 
Millah
Lahube
Bes Lahube
Omar Lahube
Makahil Omar
Ali Makahil
Yabar Makahil
Aloofi Lahube
Kabole Alofi
Bila Alofi
Yabar Alofi

Notable figures

 Amina Mohamed Abdi, Somali Politician, and  Member of Somali Parliament (MP) in the House of Representatives
 Sheikh Hassan Barsane, cleric who led a revolt against Italian colonial forces after World War I.
 Omar Faruk Osman, Somali journalist and trade unionist who is the General Secretary of the Federation of Somali Trade Unions (FESTU).
 Abdihakim Luqman, first Speaker Of Hirshabelle Parliament
 Fawziya Abikar Nur, Federal Minister for Health and Social Care in Somalia since March 2017.
Mohamed Mukhtar Ibrahim Former Minister of Petroleum and Mineral Resources.
Mohamed Olow Barrow , He served as the Minister of Fisheries and Marine Resources of Somalia

References

Somali clans